Diamond Valley is a rural locality in the Sunshine Coast Region, Queensland, Australia.

History 
Diamond Valley State School opened on 7 February 1927 and closed in 1936.

Economy 
There is a saw mill in Harris Road.

References 

Suburbs of the Sunshine Coast Region
Localities in Queensland